Caloptilia alpherakiella is a moth of the family Gracillariidae. It is known from the European part of Russia.

References

alpherakiella
Moths of Europe
Moths described in 1909